Katrina Ruth Elam (born December 12, 1983) is an American country music singer and songwriter. Signed to Universal South Records in 2004, she released her self-titled debut album that year, charting in the Billboard Hot Country Singles & Tracks (now Hot Country Songs) with the No. 29 "No End in Sight" and the No. 59 "I Want a Cowboy". A third single, "Love Is", peaked at No. 47 from an unreleased second album Turn Me Up. Elam left the label in 2008.

Early life
Elam was born in Bray, Oklahoma, population 1,035. She performed in a 4-H talent show at the age of 9. In 1998, she was named female vocalist of the year by the Oklahoma Country Music Association and the Oklahoma Opry now the Rodeo Opry. Elam received a publishing contract at the age of 16. In her senior year of high school, her mother home schooled her because of her busy writing and recording schedule.

Career
After completing high school, Katrina Elam moved to Nashville, Tennessee, where she secured a contract with Universal South Records. Jimmie Lee Sloas produced her first self-titled album, released on October 5, 2004. The album reached No. 42 on Billboard's Top Country Albums chart and No. 33 on Top Heatseekers chart. The first single, "No End in Sight", reached No. 29 on the Billboard Hot Country Songs chart. The follow-up single "I Want a Cowboy" reached No. 59 on the same chart. Elam also toured in 2004 with Keith Urban.

Elam later toured with Rascal Flatts to promote her unreleased second album, Turn Me Up. "Love Is," the first single released from the album, peaked at No. 47 on Billboard's Hot Country Songs chart in 2006. Another single from the album, "Flat on the Floor," eventually peaked at No. 52. Later in the year, Carrie Underwood includes a version of the track on her 2007 album Carnival Ride. Elam exited Universal South in 2008. Elam also co-wrote the track "Change" on Underwood's 2009 album Play On. Reba McEntire covered "I Want a Cowboy" on her 2009 album Keep on Loving You.  Elam also co-wrote Rascal Flatts' 2011 single "Easy", which features Natasha Bedingfield, and Eli Young Band's 2012 single "Say Goodnight", co-written by John Paul White of The Civil Wars. In 2014, Hunter Hayes co-wrote his single "Invisible" with Elam.

In late 2010, Elam was cast in a sequel to the 1992 film Pure Country, titled Pure Country 2: The Gift Elam's "Dream Big" was released to radio in late 2010 and served as the lead single for the movie's soundtrack, which was released on February 8, 2011.

Discography

Studio albums

Singles

Music videos

References

1983 births
Living people
People from Stephens County, Oklahoma
Country musicians from Oklahoma
American women country singers
American country singer-songwriters
Show Dog-Universal Music artists
Singer-songwriters from Oklahoma
21st-century American singers
21st-century American women singers